Nectaris, occasionally released as Military Madness, is a series of sci-fi-themed, hex map turn-based strategy games for a variety of systems. The games were developed by Hudson Soft. The company was absorbed by Konami in 2012, and as a result Konami owns the rights to the series.

Games in the series include:
 Nectaris / Military Madness (PC-Engine / TurboGrafx-16, 1989)
 Nectaris (PC 9800 & X68000, 1992)
 Neo Nectaris / Military Madness 2 (PC-Engine CD, 1994)
 Nectaris (PC DOS, 1995)
 Nectaris (Windows 95, 1997)
 Nectaris GB (Game Boy,February 1998)
 Nectaris (PlayStation, 1998), (PlayStation Network, 2008)
 Nectaris Cellular (i-mode, 2003)
 Military Madness (US cellphone (Verizon) v1.1)
 Military Madness: Nectaris (WiiWare, Xbox Live Arcade, PlayStation Network, 2009)
 Military Madness: Neo Nectaris (iPhone, 2010)

References

External links
 Base Nectaris, a fan site (Military Madness FAQ)
 Compmike's Nectaris Walkthrough

Computer wargames
DOS games
Hudson Soft games
Konami franchises
Game Boy games
NEC PC-9801 games
PlayStation (console) games
PlayStation Network games
X68000 games
Turn-based tactics video games
TurboGrafx-CD games
TurboGrafx-CD-only games
Video games scored by Chris Huelsbeck
Video games scored by Jun Chikuma
Windows games